Trachyrincinae is a subfamily of the family Macrouridae, also known as rattails. The subfamily contains two genera found in Atlantic, Indian and Pacific Ocean. These species lives in deep-water. These fishes have a long, narrow and sharply pointed snout. The chin barbel is present.

References

Macrouridae
Fish subfamilies